In semantics, mathematical logic and related disciplines, the principle of compositionality is the principle that the meaning of a complex expression is determined by the meanings of its constituent expressions and the rules used to combine them. This principle is also called Frege's principle, because Gottlob Frege is widely credited for the first modern formulation of it. The principle was never explicitly stated by Frege, and it was arguably already assumed by George Boole decades before Frege's work.

The principle of compositionality is highly debated in linguistics, and among its most challenging problems there are the issues of contextuality, the non-compositionality of idiomatic expressions, and the non-compositionality of quotations.

History 
Discussion of compositionality started to appear at the beginning of the 19th century, during which it was debated whether what was most fundamental in language was compositionality or contextuality, and compositionality was usually preferred. Frege (1848-1925) never adhered to the principle of compositionality as it is known today, and the first to explicitly formulate it was Freges' student Rudolf Carnap in 1947.

Overview
The principle of compositionality states that in a meaningful expression, if the lexical parts are taken out of the sentence, what remains will be the rules of composition. Take, for example, the sentence "Socrates was a man". Once the meaningful lexical items are taken away—"Socrates" and "man"—what is left is the pseudo-sentence, "S was a M". The task becomes a matter of describing what the connection is between S and M.

Among the most prominent linguistic problems that challenge the principle of compositionality are the issues of contextuality, the non compositionality of idiomatic expressions, and the non compositionality of quotations.

It is frequently taken to mean that every operation of the syntax should be associated with an operation of the semantics that acts on the meanings of the constituents combined by the syntactic operation. As a guideline for constructing semantic theories, this is generally taken, as in the influential work on the philosophy of language by Donald Davidson, to mean that every construct of the syntax should be associated by a clause of the T-schema with an operator in the semantics that specifies how the meaning of the whole expression is built from constituents combined by the syntactic rule. In some general mathematical theories (especially those in the tradition of Montague grammar), this guideline is taken to mean that the interpretation of a language is essentially given by a homomorphism between an algebra of syntactic representations and an algebra of semantic objects.

The principle of compositionality also exists in a similar form in the compositionality of programming languages.

Critiques 
The principle of compositionality has been the subject of intense debate. Indeed, there is no general agreement as to how the principle is to be interpreted, although there have been several attempts to provide formal definitions of it.

Scholars are also divided as to whether the principle should be regarded as a factual claim, open to empirical testing; an analytic truth, obvious from the nature of language and meaning; or a methodological principle to guide the development of theories of syntax and semantics. The Principle of Compositionality has been attacked in all three spheres, although so far none of the criticisms brought against it have been generally regarded as compelling. Most proponents of the principle, however, make certain exceptions for idiomatic expressions in natural language.

The principle of compositionality usually holds when only syntactic factors play in the increased complexity of sentence processing, while it becomes more problematic and questionable when the complexity increase is due to sentence or discourse context, semantic memory, or sensory cues. Among the problematic phenomena for traditional theories of compositionality is that of logical metonymy, which has been studied at least since the mid 1990s by linguists James Pustejovsky and Ray Jackendoff. Logical metonymies are sentences like John began the book, where the verb to begin requires (subcategorizes) an event as its argument, but in a logical metonymy an object (i.e. the book) is found instead, and this forces to interpret the sentence by inferring an implicit event ("reading", "writing", or other prototypical actions performed on a book). The problem for compositionality is that the meaning of reading or writing is not present in the words of the sentence, neither in "begin" nor in "book".

Further, in the context of the philosophy of language, the principle of compositionality does not explain all of meaning. For example, you cannot infer sarcasm purely on the basis of words and their composition, yet a phrase used sarcastically means something completely different from the same phrase uttered straightforwardly. Thus, some theorists argue that the principle has to be revised to take into account linguistic and extralinguistic context, which includes the tone of voice used, common ground between the speakers, the intentions of the speaker, and so on.

See also
Componential analysis
Context principle
Semantics (computer science)
Semantics of logic
Garden-path sentence
Initial algebra
Levels of Processing model
Opaque context — another problem for compositionality
Referential transparency — in programming languages
Semantic decomposition (natural language processing)

Notes

References
 Baggio, G., Van Lambalgen, M., & Hagoort, P. (2012) The processing consequences of compositionality, in M. Werning, W. Hinzen, & E. Machery (Eds.), The Oxford handbook of compositionality (pp. 655–672). 
 Janssen, T. M. (2012) Compositionality: Its historic context, in M. Werning, W. Hinzen, & E. Machery (Eds.), The Oxford handbook of compositionality, pp. 19-46, Oxford University Press.
 Pelletier, Francis Jeffry (2001) Did Frege believe Frege’s principle?, in Journal of Logic, Language, and Information 10:87–114.
 Pelletier, Francis Jeffry (2016) Semantic Compositionality in M. Aronoff (ed) The Oxford Research Encyclopedia of Linguistics, Oxford UP.

Further reading
 Ferreira, F., Bailey, K. G., & Ferraro, V. (2002). Good-enough representations in language comprehension in Current directions in psychological science, 11(1), 11-15.
 Ferreira, F., & Patson, N. D. (2007). The ‘good enough’approach to language comprehension in Language and Linguistics Compass, 1(1‐2), 71-83.
 (2004) revisions in 2005, 2007, 2012, 2017, 2020.
 Werning, Markus; & Edouard Machery, & Gerhard Schurz (Eds., 2004) The Compositionality of Meaning and Content, Vol. I & II, Ontos 
 Werning, Markus; & Wolfram Hinzen, & Edouard Machery (Eds., 2012) The Oxford Handbook of Compositionality, Oxford University Press

Semantics
Principles
Philosophy of language
Formal semantics (natural language)